John Halifax, Gentleman is a 1915 British silent drama film directed by George Pearson and starring Fred Paul, Peggy Hyland and Harry Paulo. It is an adaptation of the 1856 novel John Halifax, Gentleman by Dinah Craik.

Cast
 Fred Paul as John Halifax
 Peggy Hyland as Ursula March
 Harry Paulo as Abel Fletcher
 Lafayette Ranney as Phineas Fletcher
 Charles Bennett as John as a Child
 Edna Maude as Ursula as a Child
 Queenie Smith
 Bertram Burleigh

References

Bibliography
 Low, Rachael. The History of the British Film 1914-1918. Routledge, 2005.

External links

1915 films
British historical drama films
British silent feature films
1910s historical drama films
1910s English-language films
Films directed by George Pearson
Films set in England
Films set in Gloucestershire
Films based on British novels
British black-and-white films
1915 drama films
1910s British films
Silent drama films